James Guthrie Howden (4 September 1934 – 10 October 1993) was an Australian rower who competed in the 1956 Summer Olympics.

In 1956 he was a crew member of the Australian boat which won the bronze medal in the eights event.

External links
 Jim Howden's profile at Sports Reference.com
 Biography of Jim Howden

1934 births
1993 deaths
Australian male rowers
Olympic rowers of Australia
Rowers at the 1956 Summer Olympics
Olympic bronze medalists for Australia
Olympic medalists in rowing
Medalists at the 1956 Summer Olympics